Curl or bend in association football is spin on the ball which makes the ball move in a curved direction. When kicking the ball, the inside of the foot is often used to curl the ball, but this can also be done by using the outside of the foot. Similar to curl, the ball can also swerve in the air, without the spin on the ball which makes the ball curl.

Curling or bending the ball is especially used in free kicks, shots from outside the penalty area and crosses. Differences between balls can affect the amount of swerve and curl: traditional leather footballs were too heavy to curl without great effort, whereas lighter modern footballs curl more easily.

Nomenclature
The deviation of a ball from the straight path in the air is known as the curl, or swerve; however, the spin on the ball that causes this is also known as the curl. Shots that curl, bend, or swerve are known as curlers, or in extreme cases, banana shots. The technique of putting curl on a ball with the outside of the foot is sometimes known as a trivela, a Portuguese term, with Ricardo Quaresma a notable user of this skill. The topspin technique of putting straight curl (instead of side curl) on a ball is known as a dip or dipping shot. The 1950s Brazilian star Didi is thought to have invented this technique, and used it frequently when taking free kicks, which were known as folha seca ("dry" or "dead leaf," in Portuguese) free kicks. Today it is commonly known as the knuckleball technique; this technique has also been described in the media as the "tomahawk", or even the "maledetta" ("accursed," in Italian).

Usage

Free kicks

Free kick takers often curl and put spin on the ball, to curl it over or around the wall of defending players, out of the reach of the goalkeeper. Goalkeepers usually organize walls to cover one side of the goal, and then stand themselves on the other side. Thus, the free kick taker has several choices, including; either to curl the ball around the wall with finesse, to bend the ball around the wall using power, or to go over the wall (although this lessens the likelihood of scoring close-range free kicks).

The 1950s Brazilian star Didi is widely believed to have invented the folha seca technique; however, Italian forward Giuseppe Meazza before him is also credited with using the technique. Today, the knuckleball technique is notably used by modern-day players such as Juninho (whose technique has often been emulated), and Cristiano Ronaldo, who would strike the ball with either no or a low amount of spin, causing it to swerve unexpectedly at a point near the goal. Gareth Bale and Andrea Pirlo are also notable proponents of this technique when taking free-kicks.

Corners
Curling can be an effective technique when taking corners. The ball gradually moves in the air towards the goal. This is referred to as an in-swinging corner. Occasionally, a corner-taker will bend the ball towards the edge of the penalty area, for an attacker to volley, or take a touch and then shoot.

Passing
Curling can be used in passing. Effective passes from midfield to an attacking player are often the result of a curled pass around the defender, or long cross-field passes are sometimes aided by the addition of curl or backspin. This can be done with either the inside of the foot or outside of the foot. The outside of the foot may be used when a player is facing sideways and wants to use the dominant foot to make a pass; this technique is known as the trivela.

Causes
The reason that spin on a football makes it curl is known as the Magnus effect. This causes a rotating ball to form a whirlpool about itself, with one side's air moving with the ball and the other side's air moving against the ball. This creates a difference in air pressure, and the ball deviates from its path as a result of this.

The Magnus effect is named after German physicist Heinrich Gustav Magnus, who described the effect in 1852. In 1672, Isaac Newton had described it and correctly inferred the cause after observing tennis players in his Cambridge college.

Notable players
Many football players are renowned for their ability to curl or bend the ball when passing or shooting at goal, either from open play or a free kick. These include: Pelé, Didi, Rivellino, Zico, Diego Maradona, Michel Platini, Roberto Baggio, Alessandro Del Piero, Gianfranco Zola, Michael Gregoritsch, Siniša Mihajlović, Zinedine Zidane, Rivaldo, David Beckham, Roberto Carlos, Juninho, Ronald Koeman, Andrea Pirlo, Ricardo Quaresma, Gareth Bale, Philippe Coutinho, Ronaldinho, Thierry Henry, Neymar, Kaká, Miralem Pjanić, Rogério Ceni, Shunsuke Nakamura, Pierre van Hooijdonk, Hristo Stoichkov, Thomas Murg, Cristiano Ronaldo, Luka Modrić, Giuseppe Meazza, Fran Kirby, and Lionel Messi, among others.

See also

Linda Curl
Shooting
Free kick
Corner kick
 Bend It Like Beckham (2002).
It also plays a part in the Murdoch Mysteries episode "Bend It Like Brackenreid”.

Notes

References

External links
BBC Sport Academy guide on how to curl the ball
Has ball technology gone too far?

Kick (association football)
Association football skills
Association football terminology